List of events that happened during 2021 in Oceania.

Sovereign states

Australia

Chief of state: Queen Elizabeth II (since 1952)
Governor-General – David Hurley (since 2019)
Prime Minister – Scott Morrison (since 2018)

Christmas Island

Governor General of the Commonwealth of Australia: Sir Peter Cosgrove (since 2014)
Administrator: Natasha Griggs (since 2018)

Cocos (Keeling) Islands

Governor General: Sir Peter Cosgrove (since 2014)
Administrator: Natasha Griggs (since 2018)

Norfolk Island

Administrator: Eric Hutchinson (since 2017)

East Timor / Timor-Leste

President of East Timor: Francisco Guterres (since 2017)
Prime Minister: Taur Matan Ruak (since 2018)

Fiji

President of Fiji: George Konrote (since 2015)
Head of Government: Frank Bainimarama (since 2007)
Speaker: Epeli Nailatikau (since 2019)

Kiribati

President: Taneti Mamau (since 2016)

Marshall Islands

President: David Kabua (since 2020)
Speaker of the legislature: Kenneth Kedi (since 2016)

Micronesia

President of the Federated States of Micronesia: David W. Panuelo (since 2019)
Vice President of the Federated States of Micronesia: Yosiwo George (since 2015)

Nauru

President of Nauru: Lionel Aingimea (since 2019)
Speaker of Parliament: Marcus Stephen (since 2019)

Palau
 
President of Palau: Thomas Remengesau Jr. (since 2013)
Vice President
Raynold Oilouch (until January 21)
Uduch Sengebau Senior (since January 21)

Papua New Guinea

Monarchy of Papua New Guinea: Elizabeth II
Governor-General: Bob Dadae (since 2017)
Prime Minister: James Marape (since 2019)

Realm of New Zealand

The Realm of New Zealand consists of the sovereign state of New Zealand, the associated states of the Cook Islands and Niue, and the dependent territory of Tokelau. It also includes the Antarctica territorial claim of the Ross Dependency.
Monarchy of New Zealand: Elizabeth II
Governor-General of New Zealand: Patsy Reddy

New Zealand

Speaker of the New Zealand House of Representatives: Trevor Mallard
Prime Minister of New Zealand: Jacinda Ardern (since 2017)
Deputy Prime Minister of New Zealand: Grant Robertson (since 2020)

Cook Islands

Queen's Representative: Tom Marsters (since 1973)
Prime Minister of the Cook Islands: Mark Brown (since 2020)
Speaker of the Cook Islands Parliament: Niki Rattle (since 2012)

Niue

Premier of Niue: Dalton Tagelagi (since 2020)

Tokelau

Administrator of Tokelau: Ross Ardern (since 2018)
Head of Government of Tokelau: Kerisiano Kalolo (since 2019).

Samoa

Head of state: O le Ao o le Malo: Va'aletoa Sualauvi II (since 2017)
Prime Minister of Samoa
Tuilaepa Aiono Sailele Malielegaoi (until May 24)
Naomi Mataʻafa (since May 24)

Solomon Islands

Governor-General: David Vunagi (since 2019)
Prime Minister: Manasseh Sogavare (since 2019)

Tonga

Monarch: King Tupou VI (since 2012)
Prime Minister: Pohiva Tuʻiʻonetoa (since 2019)

Tuvalu

Head of State: Queen Elizabeth II
Governor-General of Tuvalu: Teniku Talesi Honolulu (since 2019)
Prime Minister of Tuvalu: Kausea Natano (since 2019)

Vanuatu

President of Vanuatu: Tallis Obed Moses (since 2017)
Prime Minister of Vanuatu: Bob Loughman (since 2020)

Dependencies

British Overseas Territories

Monarch: Queen Elizabeth II (since 1952)

Pitcairn Islands

Governor (nonresident) of the Pitcairn Islands: Laura Clark (since 2018)
Mayor and Chairman of the Island Council: Charlene Warren-Peu (since 2020)

Chile

President of Chile: Sebastián Piñera (since 2018)

Insular Chile

Intendant of Valparaíso Region: Jorge Martínez Durán
Commune of the Juan Fernández Islands
Mayor: Felipe Paredes Vergara
Province of Easter Island
Governor: Laura Alarcón Rapu (since 2018)

France

President of France: Emmanuel Macron (since 2017)
Prime Minister of France: Jean Castex (since 2020)

French Polynesia

President of French Polynesia: Édouard Fritch (since 2014)
High Commissioner of the Republic: Dominique Sorain (since 2019)
President of the Assembly of French Polynesia: Gaston Tong Sang (since 2018)

New Caledonia

High Commissioner: Laurent Prevost (since 2019)
President of the Government: Thierry Santa (since 2019)
Vice President of the Government of New Caledonia: Gilbert Tyuienon (since 2019)

Wallis and Futuna

Administrator Superior of Wallis and Futuna: Hervé Jonathan (since January 11)
President of the Territorial Assembly: Atoloto Kolokilagi (since 2019)
There are three traditional kings with limited powers.

United States

President of the United States
Donald Trump (until January 20)
Joe Biden (starting January 20)
Vice President of the United States
Mike Pence (until January 20)
Kamala Harris (starting January 20)

American Samoa

Governor
Lolo Matalasi Moliga (until January 3)
Lemanu Peleti Mauga (since January 3)

Guam

Governor: Lou Leon Guerrero (since 2019)

Hawaii

Governor of Hawaii: David Ige (since 2014)
Lieutenant Governor of Hawaii: Josh Green (since 2018)

Northern Mariana Islands

Governor: Ralph Deleon Guerrero Torres (since 2015)

Events

January and February
January 1 – 2021 New Year Honours in the Commonwealth
January 15 – Nazahat Shameen Khan of Fiji wins the presidency of the United Nations Human Rights Council (UNHRC).
January 19 – Vanuatu detains Chinese fishing boats Dong Gang Xing 13 and Dong Gang Xing 16 plus a Russian yacht for operating illegally in its waters near Hiu Island.
January 26 – Former president Xanana Gusmão of East Timor meets with Roman Catholic priest and self-proclaimed pedophile Richard Daschbach in Dili.
February 4
Henry Puna of the Cook Islands is elected Secretary General of the Pacific Islands Forum Secretariat.
For the second time in 2021 and the third time in the last ten weeks, a ship reports losing containers due to rough weather in the South Pacific.
Pal Ahluwalia, Vice-Chancellor of the University of the South Pacific and his wife are deported from Fiji to Australia.
Waves between 30 centimeters and one meter high are reported in Fiji, New Zealand, and Vanuatu.
February 16 – Australia is accused of "exporting its problems" by New Zealand Prime Minister Jacinda Ardern after cancelling the citizenship of a dual national Australian-New Zealander who joined the Islamic State in Syria (ISIS).

March and April
March 2 – 2021 Micronesian parliamentary election
March 3 – Simon Thompson, chairman of Rio Tinto mining corporation, resigns after a scandal resulting from the destruction of 46,000-year-old rock shelters at Juukan Gorge, Western Australia, in May 2020.
March 4 – An earthquake of magnitude 7.3 strikes 178 kilometers (111 miles) northeast of the city of Gisborne, New Zealand, at a depth of 10 kilometers (six miles). No injuries or serious injuries are reported, but a tsunami warning is in place. Other large earthquakes were reported near Ohunua, ʻEua, Tonga (8.1) and one near Sola, Vanuatu (6.1).
March 5 – Thirteen people are charged for workplace-related violations that took 22 lives in the 2019 Whakaari / White Island eruption in New Zealand.
March 9
Admiral Philip S. Davidson, head of the United States Indo-Pacific Command testifies before the U.S. Senate Armed Services Committee needs an Aegis Ashore missile system to protect Guam and the United States from China. Davidson wants $27 billion, including $1.6 billion for the Aegis system.
Hawaii Governor David Ige (D) declares an emergency in all five counties after heavy rains bring floods, landslides and fear of dam failures.
March 13 – 2021 Western Australian state election
March 28 – President Surangel Whipps of Palau begins a four-day visit to Taiwan to promote tourism.

Scheduled

Elections

April 9 – 2021 Samoan general election
November 2 – 2021 United States elections
November –  2021 Tongan general election

Major national and territorial holidays

January 23 – Bounty Day, Public holidays in the Pitcairn Islands
January 26 – Australia Day
February 8 – Waitangi Day celebrated, New Zealand.
March 1 – Remembrance Day (Marshall Islands), Public holidays in the Marshall Islands
March 6 – Norfolk Island Foundation Day
April 6 – Self Determination Day, Public holidays in the Cocos (Keeling) Islands
April 26 – Anzac Day celebrated, Public holidays in Australia and Public holidays in New Zealand
June 1 – Independence Day (National Day), Public holidays in Samoa
June 7 – Independence Day (National Day), Public holidays in the Solomon Islands
June 12 – Queen's Official Birthday, Commonwealth countries
June 29 – Autonomy Day, Public holidays in French Polynesia
July 4/5 – Independence Day, United States′ territories and associated states
July 12 – National Day, Public holidays in Kiribati
July 14 – Bastille Day, French territories
July 29 – Territory Day, Public holidays in Wallis and Futuna
July 30 – Independence Day, Public holidays in Vanuatu
October 4 – Tuvulu Day celebrated
October 11 – Fiji Day celebrated, List of festivals in Fiji
October 26 – Angam Day, Public holidays in Nauru
November 3 – Independence Day, Public holidays in the Federated States of Micronesia
November 4 – National Day celebrated, Tonga

Culture

Sports
January 13–23 — 2021 UCI Oceania Tour in New Zealand

Deaths
February 5 – Paul Tovua, 73, Solomon Islands politician, MP (since 1976), Speaker of the National Parliament of Solomon Islands (1994–2001).
February 26 – Michael Somare, 84, first Prime Minister of Papua New Guinea (Father of the Nation); pancreatic cancer
March 15 – Miriama Rauhihi Ness, New Zealand Māori activist and social worker.

See also

Tropical cyclones in 2021
2020–21 Australian region cyclone season
2021–22 Australian region cyclone season
2021-22 South Pacific cyclone season
2020–21 South Pacific cyclone season
2021 Pacific typhoon season

References

 
Oceania